Dame Mary Carew Pole, Lady Carew Pole, DCVO (née Dawnay; born 1936) is a British courtier.

She was born in 1936, the daughter of Lieutenant-Colonel Ronald Dawnay (1908–1990) and Lady Elizabeth Grey (1908–1941), daughter of Charles Grey, 5th Earl Grey; through her father, she is the great-granddaughter of the 8th Viscount Downe and the 5th Marquess of Waterford, and a great-great-granddaughter of the 8th Duke of Beaufort.

Dawnay was the journalist and politician Aidan Crawley's secretary from 1962 to 1966. In 1970, Princess Anne, Princess Royal, appointed Dawnay to be a lady-in-waiting and she has remained as such since then. For her services, she was appointed a Commander of the Royal Victorian Order in 2003 and promoted to Dame Commander in 2018.

In 1974, Dawnay married Richard Carew Pole, who succeeded his father as 13th baronet in 1993.

References 

Living people
1936 births
Members of the British Royal Household
Dames Commander of the Royal Victorian Order
Wives of baronets